Darijan Bojanić (born 28 December 1994) is a Swedish professional footballer who plays as a central midfielder for K League 1 club Ulsan Hyundai.

Early life
His parents fled from Bosnia and Herzegovina during the Yugoslav Wars while his mother was pregnant with him. Bojanić was born in Växjö, Sweden, and grew up in Gislaved. His mother is of Bosniak descent, while his father is ethnically Croat. Bojanić is fluent in the Bosnian language.

Club career

Östers IF
In 2010, after debuting in the senior team at local club Gislaveds IS at age 16, Bojanić moved to Östers IF in Superettan, Sweden's second tier. Around that time, he also attracted interest from several European clubs, reportedly Fulham and Heerenveen. In 2012, Bojanić made 12 appearances as Öster won Superettan and got promoted to the first division.

In 2013, Bojanić made his debut in Allsvenskan, aged 18. Midway through the season, after making 14 appearances for Öster, he transferred to IFK Göteborg.

IFK Göteborg
On 2 August 2013, Bojanić signed a four and a half-year contract with IFK Göteborg, but failed to make an impact at the club. He reportedly had disciplinary issues during his stay at IFK Göteborg and Bojanić later admitted that he once fell asleep during a team meeting. In total, Bojanić would only make 10 league appearances for the side.

Helsingborgs IF
On 15 July 2014, Bojanić moved to Helsingborgs IF. He reunited with his former coach from Öster, Roar Hansen, and soon established himself as a starting player at the club.

Bojanić fell out of favour with manager Henrik Larsson in 2016 after the player had criticised his coach in the media. Helsingborg got relegated to Superettan the same year. In 2017, he went on loan to Östersunds FK in Allsvenskan, but failed to make an impact, only making four league appearances for the side. He won the 2016–17 Svenska Cupen, the main domestic cup, with Östersund.

In 2018, Bojanić played 29 games, scored six goals and provided 13 assists, as Helsingborg won a promotion to Allsvenskan. At the end of the season, he was voted as Superettan Player of the Year.

Hammarby IF

2019
On 26 November 2018, Bojanić moved on a free transfer to Hammarby IF, signing a three and a half-year contract. He played 29 games in the 2019 season, scoring four goals and providing 11 assists, the most in the league, as Hammarby finished third in the table after eight straight wins at the end of the campaign. He vas voted as Allsvenskan Player of the Month in October, and Hammarby Player of the Season by the fans at the end of the year.

2020
In January 2020, Bojanić signed a new three and a half-year contract with Hammarby. The season was postponed due to the COVID-19 pandemic with Bojanić being in poor form and plagued by injuries, only making 23 appearances as his side disappointedly finished 8th in the table. Although, he scored from a free-kick in the first round of the 2020–21 UEFA Europa League against Puskás Akadémia (in a 3–0 win), before the club was eliminated from the tournament in the second round against Lech Poznań (in a 0–3 loss).

2021
On 30 May 2021, Bojanić won the 2020–21 Svenska Cupen with Hammarby, through a 5–4 win on penalties (0–0 after full-time) against BK Häcken in the final. He featured in all six games as the side reached the play-off round of the 2021–22 UEFA Europa Conference League, after eliminating Maribor (4–1 on aggregate) and FK Čukarički (6–4 on aggregate), where the club was knocked out by Basel (4–4 on aggregate) after a penalty shoot-out, in which Bojanić missed his attempt.

On 23 September 2021, Bojanić was appointed as the new club captain of Hammarby by head coach Miloš Milojević, replacing Jeppe Andersen. On 2 April 2022, Bojanić was demoted to vice-captain by new head coach Martí Cifuentes, being replaced by Richard Magyar.

2022
Bojanić featured in the final of the 2021–22 Svenska Cupen, in which Hammarby lost by 4–5 on penalties to Malmö FF after the game ended in a 0–0 draw. During the summer, he reportedly attracted interest from FC Zürich in the Swiss Super League, but their bid was rejected. In the league, Bojanić scored four goals in 29 appearances, often captaining his side, that ultimately finished 3rd in the Allsvenskan table. On 10 November 2022, shortly after the final game of the season, Hammarby accepted a bid from K League 1 club Ulsan Hyundai for his transfer, subject to the player's personal agreement.

Ulsan Hyundai
On 14 November 2022, Ulsan Hyundai confirmed that they had reached an agreement for his transfer, effective in January 2023.

International career
Between 2011 and 2014, Bojanić won several caps for both the Swedish U17 and U19 teams.

Bojanić was called up to the Swedish senior squad for the training tour in early 2020. He made his debut in a 1–0 friendly win against Moldova on 9 January 2020. Three days later, on 12 January, he provided the assist to Simon Hedlund as Sweden won 1–0 against Kosovo. Manager Janne Andersson praised him as one of the best Swedish players during the tour.

In 2021, Bojanić confirmed that he was contemplating switching his allegiance to Bosnia and Herzegovina, where his family originally is from, pending a call-up and an application for dual citizenship.

Style of play
As a deep-lying playmaker, Bojanić is known for his strong passing game and technique. He is also a set piece-specialist.

Career statistics

Club

International

Honours
Gislaveds IS
 Division 3 Sydvästra Götaland: 2010

Östers IF
 Superettan: 2012

Östersunds FK
 Svenska Cupen: 2016–17

Helsingborgs IF
 Superettan: 2018

Hammarby IF

 Svenska Cupen: 2020–21
Individual
 Hammarby IF Player of the Year: 2019
 Superettan Player of the Year: 2018
Allsvenskan Top assist provider: 2019

References

External links
 
 IFK Göteborg profile
 

1994 births
Living people
People from Växjö
Swedish footballers
Sweden youth international footballers
Swedish people of Croatian descent
Swedish people of Bosnia and Herzegovina descent
Östers IF players
IFK Göteborg players
Helsingborgs IF players
Östersunds FK players
Hammarby Fotboll players
Ulsan Hyundai FC players
Association football midfielders
Allsvenskan players
Superettan players
Division 3 (Swedish football) players
K League 1 players
Sportspeople from Kronoberg County
Expatriate footballers in South Korea
Swedish expatriate footballers